Coleophora psilopterella is a moth of the family Coleophoridae. It is found in Afghanistan.

References

psilopterella
Moths of Asia
Moths described in 1967